The Ultimate Collection is a compilation album by the English heavy metal band Black Sabbath, first released on 28 October 2016. Remastered by engineer Andy Pearce and curated by the members of the band, the album was released during the band's final concert tour, The End Tour. This album saw the first US release of "Evil Woman" and the first UK release of "Wicked World".

Release
The Ultimate Collection was released on CD and digital platforms on 28 October 2016. This was followed on 18 November with the limited edition "Crucifold" box set release, which contains four vinyl LPs and folds out into the shape of a cross. The CD and LP releases were made available in the United States in February 2017.

Reception
Leigh Sanders of Express & Star gave the album a positive review, calling it "[a] great collection." Ulf Kubanke of Laut.de also reviewed the album positively, complimenting the songs and the sound quality.

Track listing

Charts

Certifications

References

Black Sabbath compilation albums
2016 compilation albums